David Henry Gorski is an American surgical oncologist, professor of surgery at Wayne State University School of Medicine, and a surgical oncologist at the Barbara Ann Karmanos Cancer Institute, specializing in breast cancer surgery. He is an outspoken skeptic, and a critic of alternative medicine and the anti-vaccination movement. He is the author of the blog Respectful Insolence, and the managing editor of the website Science-Based Medicine.

Early life and education
Gorski attended the University of Michigan, where he received an MD in 1988. In 1989, he entered a residency in general surgery at the University Hospitals of Cleveland. He left residency for a PhD in cellular physiology at Case Western Reserve University, completed in 1994, with a dissertation entitled "Homeobox Gene Expression and Regulation in Vascular Myocytes." Gorski continued his residency (1993–96) and completed a surgical oncology research fellowship (1996–99) at The University of Chicago.

Career
Gorski was previously Assistant Professor of Surgery at the Rutgers Cancer Institute of New Jersey and the UMDNJ-Robert Wood Johnson Medical School, in New Brunswick, NJ. He also served as a member of the graduate program in Cell and Developmental Biology at Rutgers University in Piscataway, NJ.

In 2010, he was appointed medical director of the Alexander J. Walt Comprehensive Breast Center at the Barbara Ann Karmanos Cancer Institute. In 2013, he became the co-director of the Michigan Breast Oncology Quality Initiative.

Gorski is a Professor of Surgery and Oncology at the Wayne State University School of Medicine, whose laboratory conducts research on transcriptional regulation of vascular endothelial cell phenotype, as well as the role of metabotropic glutamate receptors in breast cancer. In 2009, he was appointed the cancer liaison physician for the American College of Surgeons Committee on Cancer. He is listed as a founder of the Institute for Science in Medicine and as a member of the American Society of Clinical Oncology.

In 2007 he received the Advanced Clinical Research Award in Breast Cancer from the American Society of Clinical Oncology. He was awarded research grants by The Breast Cancer Research Foundation in 2008, 2009, and 2010.

Research
Gorski's article "Blockade of the vascular endothelial growth factor stress response increases the antitumor effects of ionizing radiation", characterizing the effects of angiogenesis inhibitors on the effectiveness of anti-tumor therapies, has been cited over 900 times according to PubMed.  This research has been used in anti-tumor therapeutic research, including an observation that angiogenesis inhibitors enhanced the therapeutic effects of ionizing radiation "by preventing repair of radiation damage to endothelial cells," and in determining the potential of combinational therapies to allow reduction of the dosages in toxic conventional treatments while sustaining tumor regression when combined with specific antibodies and radiation therapy.

Gorski's work with Helena Mauceri and others, published in Nature as "Combined effects of angiostatin and ionizing radiation in antitumour therapy" studied the "combined effects of angiostatin" (a protein occurring in several animal species) "and ionizing radiation in anti-tumor therapy" led to investigation into the selective destruction of tumor cells, which according to a study by Gregg L. Semenza (citing Mauceri and others), "are more hypoxic than normal cells," allowing for "tumor cells to be killed without major systemic side effects."

His article with Yun Chen "Regulation of angiogenesis through a microRNA (miR-130a) that down-regulates antiangiogenic homeobox genes GAX and HOXA5" investigated into the use of microRNA to regulate angiogenesis led to research by Jason E. Fish's group at the University of California, San Francisco, into the use of microRNA to regulate blood vessel development, and thus limiting tumor growth. Citing Chen and Gorski's research, Fish wrote that "several broadly expressed microRNAs regulate in vitro endothelial cell behavior, including proliferation, migration, and the ability to form capillary networks", and sought to describe the in vivo functionality of a specific set of microRNAs and their targets; the group was able to isolate a particular microRNA (miR-126) as the most highly enriched in endothelial cells.

Skepticism of alternative medicine

Gorski is a skeptic of alternative medicine. In 2004,  he began writing a blog entitled Respectful Insolence under the pen name Orac at Blogspot. Two years later, it was moved to the ScienceBlogs website. In 2008 Gorski used his real name when he started blogging at Science-Based Medicine (he continues to use Orac for Respectful Insolence). He serves as the managing editor at Science-Based Medicine, where he has posted on issues of medicine and pseudoscience, including the anti-vaccination movement, alternative therapies, and cancer research and treatment. In 2010, Gorski recounted how members of the anti-vaccine blog Age of Autism wrote to the board of directors at Wayne State University and asked that he be prevented from blogging.

Gorski contributed to the James Randi Education Foundation's series of EBooks: Science Based Medicine Guides. He is a fellow of the Committee for Skeptical Inquiry. He was a speaker at The Amaz!ng Meeting in 2009, 2010, 2012 and 2013. He has also participated in numerous panels on alternative medicine. He called attention to a paper by John P. A. Ioannidis on problems with published research. Gorski has criticized the prevalence of pseudoscience in the medical field including the use of alternative therapies, acupuncture, detoxification, and the use of dietary treatment to manage autism.

Gorski has advocated for open research data of clinical trial results and for only using evidence-based medicine to treat disease. He has been critical of Senator Tom Harkin's support of the National Center for Complementary and Alternative Medicine (NCCAM), which became the National Center for Complementary and Integrative Health. He has criticized the National Institutes of Health (NIH) and NCCAM for funding and publishing research on unproven therapies not supported by science-based evidence, and has commented on medical ethics and methods of alternative medicine.

Gorski has criticized popularization of pseudoscience by the media and celebrities such as Oprah Winfrey, Bill Maher, Ann Coulter, and The Huffington Post. In June 2013, he expressed support for healthcare professionals speaking out against poor medical practices and the sale of unproven treatments. Gorski was interviewed by WPRR in 2012. He called the co-sponsorship of Integrative Medicine Day by the American Medical Student Association "quackademic medicine".

Writing for Utne Reader in 2012, David H. Freedman described Gorski as being among the "prickly anti-alternative-medicine warriors." 

In 2014, Gorski and fellow skeptic Steven Novella published an article denouncing the study of integrative medicine as harmful to science.

Publications
 
 
 
 2018 Pseudoscience: The Conspiracy Against Science "Integrative' Medicine: Integrating Quackery with Science-Based Medicine" :MIT Press: edited by Allison B. Kaufman, James C. Kaufman:

References

External links
 Respectful Insolence, Gorski's blog
 David Gorski's articles at Science Based Medicine
 Gorski's presentation at National Science Foundation
 
 Research page at WSU
 Department of surgery

American bloggers
American oncologists
American people of Polish descent
American skeptics
American surgeons
Cancer researchers
Case Western Reserve University alumni
Critics of alternative medicine
Living people
Science activists
University of Michigan Medical School alumni
Wayne State University faculty
Year of birth missing (living people)